Liu Xin, also known by her stage name as Cya Liu Ya-se (born 13 January 1989), is a Chinese actress and singer. 

Formerly as a member of the Chinese girl group OP, she was noticed by the audience through her role as Zhu Xiaobei in the movie So Young (2013). In 2022, she won Best Actress at the 40th Hong Kong Film Awards for her role Wong To in Limbo.

Filmography

References

External links 
 
 刘雅瑟 官方微博
 

1989 births
Living people
Chinese film actresses
Chinese television actresses
Chinese women singers